Wassily Wassilyevich Leontief (August 5, 1905 – February 5, 1999), was a Soviet-American economist known for his research on input–output analysis and how changes in one economic sector may affect other sectors.

Leontief won the Nobel Memorial Prize in Economic Sciences in 1973, and four of his doctoral students have also been awarded the prize (Paul Samuelson 1970, Robert Solow 1987, Vernon L. Smith 2002, Thomas Schelling 2005).

Biography

Early life
Wassily Leontief was born on August 5, 1905, in Munich, Germany, the son of Wassily W. Leontief (professor of Economics) and Zlata (German spelling Slata; later Evgenia) Leontief (née Becker). Wassily Leontief Sr. belonged to a family of Russian old-believer merchants living in St. Petersburg since 1741. Evgenia (Genya) Becker belonged to a wealthy Jewish family from Odessa. At 15 in 1921, Wassily Jr. entered University of Leningrad in present-day St. Petersburg. He earned his Learned Economist degree (equivalent to Master of Arts) in 1925 at the age of 19.

Opposition in USSR
Leontief sided with campaigners for academic autonomy, freedom of speech and in support of Pitirim Sorokin. As a consequence, he was detained several times by the Cheka. In 1925, he was allowed to leave the USSR, mostly because the Cheka believed that he was mortally ill  with a sarcoma, a diagnosis that later proved false. He continued his studies at the Friedrich Wilhelm University in Berlin and, in 1928, earned a Ph.D. degree in economics under the direction of Werner Sombart, writing his dissertation on The Economy as Circular Flow (original German title: Die Wirtschaft als Kreislauf).

Early professional life
From 1927 to 1930, he worked at the Institute for the World Economy of the University of Kiel. There he researched the derivation of statistical demand and supply curves. In 1929, he traveled to China to assist its ministry of railroads as an advisor.

In 1931, he went to the United States and was employed by the National Bureau of Economic Research.

During World War II, Leontief served as consultant at the U. S. Office of Strategic Services.

Harvard
Leontief joined Harvard University's department of economics in 1932 and in 1946 became professor of economics there.

In 1949, Leontief used an early computer at Harvard and data from the U.S. Bureau of Labor Statistics to divide the U.S. economy into 500 sectors. Leontief modeled each sector with a linear equation based on the data and used the computer, the Harvard Mark II, to solve the system, one of the first significant uses of computers for mathematical modeling, along with George W. Snedecor's usage of the Atanasoff–Berry computer.

Leontief set up the Harvard Economic Research Project in 1948 and remained its director until 1973.  Starting in 1965, he chaired the Harvard Society of Fellows.

New York University
In 1975, Leontief joined New York University and founded and directed the Institute for Economic Analysis. He taught graduate and undergraduate classes.

Personal life
In 1932, Leontief married the poet Estelle Marks (1908-2005). Their only child, Svetlana Leontief Alpers, was born in 1936. Estelle wrote a memoir, Genia and Wassily, of their relations with his parents after they came to the US as émigrés.

As hobbies Leontief enjoyed fly fishing, ballet, and fine wines. He vacationed for years at his farm in West Burke, Vermont, but after moving to New York in the 1970s moved his summer residence to Lakeville, Connecticut.

Leontief died in New York City on Friday, February 5, 1999, at the age of 93.

Major contributions
Leontief is credited with developing early contributions to input–output analysis and earned the Nobel Prize in Economics for his development of its associated theory. He has also made contributions in other areas of economics, such as international trade where he documented the Leontief paradox. He was also one of the first to establish the composite commodity theorem.

Leontief earned the Nobel Prize in economics for his work on input–output tables. Input–output tables analyze the process by which inputs from one industry produce outputs for consumption or for inputs for another industry. With the input–output table, one can estimate the change in demand for inputs resulting from a change in production of the final good. The analysis assumes that input proportions are fixed; thus the use of input–output analysis is limited to rough approximations rather than prediction. Input–output was novel and inspired large-scale empirical work; in 2010 its iterative method was recognized as an early intellectual precursor to Google's PageRank.

Leontief used input–output analysis to study the characteristics of trade flow between the U.S. and other countries, and found what has been named Leontief's paradox; "this country resorts to foreign trade in order to economize its capital and dispose of its surplus labor, rather than vice versa", i.e., U.S. exports were relatively labor-intensive when compared to U.S. imports. This is the opposite of what one would expect, considering the fact that the U.S.'s comparative advantage was in capital-intensive goods. According to some economists, this paradox has since been explained as due to the fact that when a country produces "more than two goods, the abundance of capital relative to labor does not imply that the capital intensity of its exports should exceed that of imports."

Leontief was also a very strong proponent of the use of quantitative data in the study of economics. Throughout his life Leontief campaigned against "theoretical assumptions and non-observed facts". According to Leontief, too many economists were reluctant to "get their hands dirty" by working with raw empirical facts. To that end, Wassily Leontief did much to make quantitative data more accessible, and more indispensable, to the study of economics.

Publications
 1925: Баланс народного хозяйства СССР.
 1928: Die Wirtschaft als Kreislauf, Tübingen: Mohr: re-published as The economy as a circular flow, pp. 181–212 in: Structural Change and Economic Dynamics, Volume 2, Issue 1, June 1991; this translation is abridged to avoid controversial statements.
  
  
 1941: Structure of the American Economy, 1919–1929
 1953: Studies in the Structure of the American Economy
 1966: Input-Output Economics
 1966: Essays in Economics
  
  
  
 1977: Essays in Economics, II
 1977: The Future of the World Economy
 1983: Military Spending: Facts and Figures, Worldwide Implications and Future Outlook co-authed with F. Duchin.
 1983: The Future of Non-Fuel Minerals in the U. S. And World Economy co-authed with J. Koo, S. Nasar and I. Sohn
 1986: The Future Impact of Automation on Workers co-authored with F. Duchin

Awards
 1953: Order of the Cherubim, University of Pisa
 1962: Dr honoris causa, University of Brussels
 1967: Dr of the University, University of York
 1968: Officer of the French Légion d'honneur
 1970: Bernhard-Harms Prize Economics, West Germany
 1971: Dr honoris causa, University of Louvain
 1972: Dr honoris causa, University of Paris (Sorbonne)
 1973: Bank of Sweden Prize in Economic Sciences in Memory of Alfred Nobel, a.k.a. Nobel Prize in Economics
 1976: Dr honoris causa, University of Pennsylvania
 1980: Dr honoris causa, University of Toulouse, France
 1980: Dr honoris causa, University of Louisville, Kentucky
 1980: Doctor of Social Sciences, University of Vermont
 1980: Doctor of Laws, C. W. Post Center, Long Island University
 1980: Russian-American Hall of Fame
 1981: Karl Marx University, Budapest, Hungary
 1984: Order of the Rising Sun, Japan
 1985: Commandeur, French Order of Arts and Letters
 1988: Dr honoris causa, Adelphi College
 1988: Foreign member, USSR Academy of Sciences
 1989: Society of the Optimate, Italian Cultural Institute, New York
 1990: Dr honoris causa, University of Córdoba, Spain
 1991: Takemi Memorial Award, Institute of Seizon & Life Sciences, Japan
 1995: Harry Edmonds Award for Life Achievement, International House, New York
 1995: Dr honoris causa, Humboldt University, Berlin, Germany
 Award of Excellence, The International Center in New York

In honor
The Global Development and Environment Institute at Tufts University awards the Leontief Prize in Economics each year in his honor.

Leontief is listed in the Russian-American Chamber of Fame of Congress of Russian Americans, which is dedicated to Russian immigrants who made outstanding contributions to American science or culture.

Memberships
 1954: President of the Econometric Society
 1968: Corresponding Member of the Institut de France
 1970: President of the American Economic Association
 1970: Corresponding Fellow of the British Academy
 1974: US-USSR Commission on the Social Sciences and Humanities of the International Research and Exchanges Board
 1975: American Committee on East-West Accord
 1975: Accademia Nazionale dei Lincie, Italy
 1976: President and Section F. of the British Association for the Advancement of Science
 1976: Honorary Member of the Royal Irish Academy
 1977: Fellow of the American Association for the Advancement of Science
 1978: Commission to Study the Organization of Peace
 1978–1986: Board of Trustees of North Carolina School of Science and Mathematics
 1979: Century Club
 1979: Issues Committee of the Progressive Alliance
 1980: Committee for National Security
 1981: Board of Visitors, College of Liberal Arts, Boston University
 1981: Board of Editors, Journal of Business Strategy
 1982: International Advisory Council of the Delian Institute of International Relations
 1982: Accademia Mediterranea Delle Scienze, Italy
 1983: Board of Advisors, Environmental Fund
 1983: Board of Directors, Tolstoy Foundation
 1985: International Committee, Carnegie Mellon University
 1990: Academy of Creative Endeavors, USSR
 1992: International Charitable Foundation, Russia
 1993: Academie Europeenne
 1993: Honorary President of the World Academy for the Progress of Planning Science, Italy
 1993: Member of the Academie Universelle des Cultures, France
 1994: Fellow of the New York Academy of Sciences
 1995: Member of the International Leadership Center on Longevity & Society, Mt. Sinai Hospital
 American Philosophical Society
 American Academy of Arts and Sciences
 International Statistical Institute
 Honorary Member of the Japan Economic Research Center, Tokyo
 Honorary Fellow of the Royal Statistical Society, London
 Trustee of Economists for Peace and Security

Quotes

See also
 List of economists
 List of Jewish Nobel laureates

References and sources

External links

 
 Information from www.iioa.org
 Article by James K. Galbraith
 Interview with W.Leontief by S.A.Kalyadina 
 IDEAS/RePEc
 

1905 births
1999 deaths
Nobel laureates in Economics
American Nobel laureates
20th-century American economists
General equilibrium theorists
Harvard University faculty
New York University faculty
Soviet expatriates in Germany
Academics from Saint Petersburg
Soviet economists
Soviet Jews
Jewish American social scientists
Saint Petersburg State University alumni
Fellows of the American Statistical Association
Soviet emigrants to the United States
Fellows of the Econometric Society
Presidents of the Econometric Society
Presidents of the American Economic Association
Distinguished Fellows of the American Economic Association
National Bureau of Economic Research
Members of the United States National Academy of Sciences
Foreign Members of the USSR Academy of Sciences
Foreign Members of the Russian Academy of Sciences
Corresponding Fellows of the British Academy